Aglay (Aleksey) Dmitriyevich Kuzmin-Korovaev (May 23, 1864 – 1918) was an Imperial Russian lieutenant general and division commander. He was the younger brother of Vladimir Kuzmin-Karavayev.

Awards
Order of Saint Stanislaus (House of Romanov), 3rd class, 1895
Order of Saint Anna, 3rd class, 1899
Order of Saint Stanislaus (House of Romanov), 2nd class, 1903
Order of Saint Anna, 2nd class, 1906
Order of Saint Vladimir, 3rd class, 1909
Order of Saint Stanislaus (House of Romanov), 1st class, 1912
Order of Saint Anna, 1st class, 1915
Order of Saint Anna, 1st class with swords, 1916

References

Bibliography
 Семь веков служат отечеству. Старинный род Кузьминых-Караваевых // Источник, №5, 1995.

Sources
 
 Фрейман О. Р. Пажи за 183 года (1711—1894). Биографии бывших пажей с портретами. — Фридрихсгамн, 1894. — С. 711.

1864 births
1918 deaths
Recipients of the Order of Saint Stanislaus (Russian), 3rd class
Recipients of the Order of St. Anna, 3rd class
Recipients of the Order of Saint Stanislaus (Russian), 2nd class
Recipients of the Order of St. Anna, 2nd class
Recipients of the Order of St. Vladimir, 3rd class
Recipients of the Order of Saint Stanislaus (Russian), 1st class
Recipients of the Order of St. Anna, 1st class